Tad the Lost Explorer and the Secret of King Midas (released outside of the UK and US as Tad Jones: The Hero Returns and Tad 2: The Secret of King Midas among other titles) is a 2017 Spanish 3D computer-animated adventure comedy film co-directed by Enrique Gato (who directed the first film) and David Alonso. Produced by Ikiru Films, Telecinco Cinema, El Toro Pictures, Lightbox Entertainment and Telefónica Studios, it is a sequel to Tad, The Lost Explorer (2012).

The film had its world premiere at the Annecy International Animation Film Festival on 13 June 2017 and was theatrically released on 25 August 2017 in Spain by Paramount Pictures,and was also released in the UK on February 9, 2018  It had a worldwide gross of $35 million against a budget of €9 million ($11.8 million) making it a box office success. Like the first film, Tad the Lost Explorer and the Secret of King Midas received some negative reviews from American critics, but was very well received by Spanish critics, who even considered it superior to the first film. It won Best Animated Film at the 32nd Goya Awards, 5th Platino Awards, 73rd CEC Awards and 10th Gaudí Awards.

A third installment  Tad, the Lost Explorer and the Emerald Tablet, was released in 2022.

Films set in Chicago

Plot 
Tad travels to Las Vegas to see his love Sara's latest discovery: a papyrus that proves the existence of King Midas, who turned everything he touched into gold by using the power of a magical necklace. However, Jack Rackham steals the papyrus and kidnaps Sara in order to force her to find the necklace for him, which means Tad has to attempt to find and save her.

Voice cast 
 Óscar Barberán as Tadeo "Tad" Jones
 Michelle Jenner as Sara Lavrof
 Luis Posada as Mummy
 Adriana Ugarte as Tiffany Maze
 Miguel Ángel Jenner as Jack Rackham
 Trevor White as Tad Stones (English version)
 Alex Kelly as Sara Lavrof (English version)
 Joseph Balderrama as Mummy/Construction Worker (English version)
 Gemma Whelan as Tiffany Maze/Henchwoman (English version)
 Ramon Tikaram as Jack Rackham (English version)
 Lewis MacLeod as Taxi Driver (English Version)

Release 
The film had its world premiere at the Annecy International Animation Film Festival on 13 June 2017 and was theatrically released on 25 August 2017 in Spain by Paramount Pictures. It was also released in the UK on February 9, 2018. It had a worldwide gross of $35,704,046 against a budget of €9,000,000 ($10,872,270) making it a box office success.

Reception 
Like the first film, the sequel received mostly negative reviews from few American critics and positive reviews in Spain, though both agreeing that it is an improvement to the predecessor, particularly for its visual aspects. On review aggregator Rotten Tomatoes, the film has an approval rating of 29% based on 14 reviews.

The movie received controversy from Spanish lawyers, due to a scene in which the Mummy states that he was exiled from Paititi due to letting Tad go at the end of the events of the first film, but also due to having "A bad deal with [his] lawyer". Victoria Ortega, president of the General Council of Spanish Lawyers, wrote an open letter to Enrique Gato stating she understands said line was not written with bad intentions, but rather ignorance.

Accolades

References

External links 
 

2017 films
2017 computer-animated films
Films set in Spain
Films set in Turkey
Spanish computer-animated films
Spanish 3D films
2017 animated films
Films scored by Zacarías M. de la Riva
Ikiru Films films
Telecinco Cinema films